Current Gene Therapy is a peer-reviewed medical journal published by Bentham Science Publishers. The editor-in-chief is Liang Cheng (Harbin Medical University Harbin, China). The focus of this journal is  pre-clinical or clinical research on gene therapy. Formats of publication include original research reports, review papers, and rapid communications ("letters").

Abstracting and indexing 
The journal is indexed in:    

According to the Journal Citation Reports, the journal has a 2019 impact factor of 2.431.

References

External links 
 

Publications established in 2001
Bentham Science Publishers academic journals
English-language journals
Medical genetics journals